"Born to Be My Baby" is a song by American rock band Bon Jovi. It was written by Jon Bon Jovi, Richie Sambora, and Desmond Child.  It was released on November 24, 1988 as the second single from their fourth studio album New Jersey.  It peaked the following year at number 2 on the Cash BoxTop 100, 3 on the Billboard Hot 100 ,    number 7 on the Mainstream Rock Tracks chart, number 22 in the UK, and number 30 in Australia.

Cash Box considered the song to be Jon Bon Jovi paying respect to Bruce Springsteen.  Cash Box ranked it as the #22 pop single of 1989.

"Born to Be My Baby" was the second of five singles from New Jersey to chart in the Top 10 of the Billboard Hot 100, the most top 10 hits for any glam metal album. Despite the song's success, it was not included in the 1994 Cross Road greatest hits album. However the song was included on Bon Jovi's Greatest Hits album in 2010. In addition, an acoustic version of the song was recorded for their album This Left Feels Right.

Music video
The video for the song was done in all black-and-white, like many of the band's videos from the New Jersey album.

A very low budget video, it was shot all in the studio, chronicling the recording process for "Born to Be My Baby". In the full length video, there is actually a dialogue between the band members, and the band does the chorus again, unsatisfied with the original version. The video prominently features photogenic shots of Jon Bon Jovi singing, as well as the band gathering around a microphone to sing the "na-na-na-na-na" part. The video also features Jon Bon Jovi's wife, Dorothea.

The video was featured on New Jersey: The Videos, a promotional VHS that is no longer manufactured. The video was absent from the video collection Cross Road: The Videos. It was later featured on Bon Jovi's 2010 release Greatest Hits - The Ultimate Video Collection.

The ending of the video depicts Bon Jovi cheering and hugging each other. This was the moment that the band learned New Jersey was the No. 1 album in the U.S.

Charts

Weekly charts

Year-end charts

See also
List of glam metal albums and songs

References

1988 singles
Black-and-white music videos
Bon Jovi songs
Songs written by Desmond Child
Songs written by Jon Bon Jovi
Songs written by Richie Sambora
Song recordings produced by Bruce Fairbairn
Mercury Records singles
Music videos directed by Wayne Isham
1988 songs